"You Are My Joy" is the first UK single released by Scottish indie rock supergroup The Reindeer Section. It was released on 10 June 2002. This is the only single release currently for The Reindeer Section.

The track received airplay from Radio1, Xfm and Virgin, as well as MTV2. The song was also a stand-out track in the set at the Carling Weekend Festival in the summer.

Two versions of singles were issued, one under Bright Star Recordings and one under Play It Again Sam Recordings (PIAS). Both versions contained a demo version of the song "Budapest", a finished version of which appeared as track 2 on the album Son of Evil Reindeer. The single release under PIAS additionally contained a remix of You Are My Joy by noted DJ Freelance Hellraiser.

The song has been used in two television programs in the United States; one time in the third episode of the hit medical drama Grey's Anatomy, and another in the American adaptation of the UK series Queer as Folk. Accordingly, "You Are My Joy" is included in the latter's Fourth Season soundtrack.

Track listing
7" Vinyl:
"You Are My Joy" - 3:44
"Budapest (Demo)" - 2:28

CD single:
"You Are My Joy" - 3:44
"You Are My Joy (The Freelancer Hellraiser "Birds Love the 80's" Remix)" - 3:23
"Budapest (Demo)" - 2:28

Covers
Alternative rock band Snow Patrol, members of which also play in The Reindeer Section, have covered the song live on more than one occasion. Their cover at a Somerset House concert was included on the DVD Live at Somerset House. This recording also appeared as a b-side to the single "How to Be Dead". Snow Patrol additionally covered the song at T in the Park 2004, but this recording has not been officially released. The song is included in Snow Patrol's compilation album Up To Now released in 2009.

Charts

References

External links
Play It Again Sam Recordings

2002 singles
Snow Patrol songs
Songs written by Gary Lightbody
Songs written by Iain Archer